Marcel Forhan (alias Yram) (November 1884, Corbeil-Essonnes, France – 1 October 1927, Shanghai, China) was an electrical engineer, specialized in the electrical installations of trams and TSF stations and an occultist writer. He owes his notoriety to a metaphysical trilogy published in many countries.

His books relate experiences lived outside the physical body using a technique named astral projection. The deductions he reaches found in his eyes a new paradigm, perhaps utopian, capable of creating a more equitable society which would no longer fear the advent of death and act in a philanthropic way.

Some of its themes are common (but not specific) to Theosophy (the notion of karma, astral body, successive higher planes and spiritual evolution) and to representative authors such as Arthur Edward Powell.

He died of dysentery on October 1, 1927 in Shanghai.

Biography 

Marcel Louis Forhan was born on November 17, 1884 in Corbeil-Essonnes, France. Son of Louis Forhan and Céline Berthelot, he had a brother, Julien, and two sisters, Marcelline and Léa.  He worked as an electrical engineer for the French company of tramways and electric lighting which sent him to settle, shortly before the First World War, in the French concession of Shanghai.  This was in order to install an important power station there, which provided electricity on which French Trams depended. He also participated in the installation of TSF broadcasting stations.

His fiancée, Suzanne Garbe (Born February 4, 1892, Guise), joined him in China from Egypt where she lived with her mother. They got married on August 17, 1914, in Shanghai. In China, they had three children, Max (born in 1915), Marcel-André (born in 1919) and Robert (born in 1920).

In 1927, he contracted dysentery which developed into sepsis. Forhan died on October 1, 1927 in Shanghai.

Works 
His books describe several out of body experiences he claims to have had.

Published works 

 Love each other (volume 1) published by Adyar, 1925.
 The doctor of the soul (volume 2) published by Adyar, 1925 (later republished).
 Evolution in the Superior Worlds (volume 3) published by Adyar, 1926, published by GVP, 2000.
 From dream to action (unpublished book, its notebooks having been lost)
 Practical astral projection , Kessinger Publishing co / Samuel Weiser Inc., New York
 Amaos los unos a los otros - Análisis y síntesis del amor universal , Colección Horus Mayor, Kier, 1959, 158 p.
 El Medico del alma , Colección Horus Mayor, Kier, 1959
 La Evolución de los Mundos Superiores , Colección Horus Mayor, Kier, 1959, 190 p. (Argentina)
 Secretele Luminor Astrale , Editurii Shambala, 1998 (Romania)

References

External links 
 Yram (1884–1917), OccultHealth.com

French occult writers